Corliss is both a surname and a given name.

People
Given name
 Corliss Lamont (1902–1995), American philosopher, political activist, and philanthropist
 C. C. Moseley (1894–1974), American aviator and aviation businessman
 Corliss Palmer (1899–1952), American silent film actress
 Corliss P. Stone (1806–1873), mayor of Seattle and businessman
 Corliss Waitman (born 1995), Belgian-born American football punter for the Pittsburgh Steelers
 Corliss Williamson (born 1973), basketball player
Surname
 Augustus W. Corliss (1837–1907), American writer, historian and Civil War veteran
 George Henry Corliss (1817–1888), inventor of the Corliss steam engine
 George W. Corliss (1834–1903), American Civil War recipient of the Medal of Honor 
 Guy C. H. Corliss (1858–1937), American judge and justice of the Supreme Court of North Dakota
 Jack Corliss, scientist and discoverer of undersea hydrothermal vents
 Jeb Corliss (born 1976), American skydiver and base jumper
 John Blaisdell Corliss (1851–1929), U.S. Representative from Michigan
 Stephen P. Corliss (1842–1904), American Civil War recipient of the Medal of Honor
 Richard Corliss (1944–2015), American journalist, Time magazine
 William R. Corliss (1926–2011), American physicist and writer

Fictional
 title teenage character of the American radio show Meet Corliss Archer (1943–1956) and the TV series
 Bud Corliss, villain of A Kiss Before Dying (novel) and two film adaptations (renamed Jonathan Corliss in the second)